Zhengdong may refer to:

Zhengdong New Area, Zhengzhou, Henan, China
Zhengdong, Yunnan, in Jiangcheng Hani and Yi Autonomous County, Yunnan, China
Zhengdong Province (1270–1356) in Korea when Goryeo was under the Mongol Yuan empire in China

See also
Jana Ueekata (1549–1611) or Tei Dō (Chinese: Zheng Dong), Ryukyuan aristocrat and bureaucrat